Lake Dringo (also called Sedringo) is a volcanic crater lake located in Pekasiran village, Batur sub-district, Central Java, Indonesia. It was formed from the eruption of Dringo Volcano in 1786.

Geology 
Dringo Volcano was formed during the post-caldera I period, which is about 1 - 2 million years ago, as a part of the Dieng Volcanic Complex in the Batur depression region. The Dringo Volcano was built up mostly of intermediate composition and pyroxene andesite. 

Lake Dringo is the site of Dringo Volcano eruption, indicated by the pyroclastic flows breccia outcrops around the lake which are generally found in a weathered weathered, brown, and altered conditions. The breccia fragments consist of pyroxene andesite: plagioclase, pyroxene, opaque minerals, and glass as groundmass.

References 

Volcanic crater lakes
Tourist attractions in Indonesia
Lakes of Java
Tourist attractions in Central Java